The 2003–04 Combined Counties Football League season was the 26th in the history of the Combined Counties Football League, a football competition in England. This season saw the league were expanded up to two divisions after the Surrey County Senior League was adsorbed by the Combined Counties League and became new Division One.

Premier Division

The Premier Division featured 23 clubs from the previous season, along with one new club:
Horley Town, joined from the Surrey County Senior League

League table

Division One

This season the league was expanded to two divisions after the Surrey County Senior League was absorbed by the Combined Counties League.

League table

External links
 Combined Counties League Official Site

2003-04
2003–04 in English football leagues